Cold Bay Airport  is a state owned, public use airport located in Cold Bay, a city in the Aleutians East Borough of the U.S. state of Alaska. First built as a United States Army Air Forces airfield during World War II, it is one of the main airports serving the Alaska Peninsula. Scheduled passenger service is available and air taxi operators fly in and out of the airport daily. Formerly, the airport operated as Thornbrough Air Force Base.

According to Federal Aviation Administration (FAA) records, the airport had 9,105 passenger boardings (enplanements) in calendar year 2008, 8,968 enplanements in 2009, and 9,261 in 2010. It is included in the National Plan of Integrated Airport Systems for 2011–2015, which categorized it as a "non-primary commercial service" airport, meaning it has between 2,500 and 10,000 enplanements per year.

Cold Bays main runway is the fifth-largest in Alaska and was built during World War II. Today, it is used for scheduled cargo flights by Alaska Central Express and is sometimes used as an emergency diversion airport for passenger flights crossing the Pacific Ocean.

A myth describes Cold Bay Airport as an alternate landing site for Space Shuttles, but the National Aeronautics and Space Administration (NASA) has stated that it was never so designated, and it was not within the entry crossrange capability of Space Shuttles.

There is a National Weather Service (NWS) office (which sends up radiosonde balloons twice a day) colocated with the FAA Flight Service Station at the airport. The NWS ranks Cold Bay as the cloudiest city in the United States.

History
The airport was constructed during World War II as Fort Randall Army Airfield, eventually becoming an Air Force base during the Cold War.

Facilities and aircraft 
Cold Bay Airport covers 2,213 acres (896 ha) and has two asphalt paved runways: 15/33 is 10,180 by 150 feet (3,174 x 46 m) and 8/26 is 4,900 by 150 feet (1,494 x 46 m). For the 12-month period ending October 30, 2017, the airport had 9,090 aircraft operations, an average of 25 per day: 63% air taxi, 30% scheduled commercial, 5% military, and 2% general aviation.

Airlines and destinations 

The following airlines offer scheduled passenger service at this airport:

Historical airline service

Reeve Aleutian Airways (RAA) served Cold Bay with scheduled passenger flights for many years.  During the 1970s and 1980s, Reeve was operating nonstop flights to Anchorage (ANC) with Lockheed L-188 Electra and NAMC YS-11 turboprop aircraft.  Reeve was also operating Electra propjet service nonstop to Seattle (SEA) on a three flights per week schedule in 1979.  By 1989, the airline had introduced nonstop jet service to Anchorage operated with Boeing 727-100 combi aircraft which were capable of transporting both passengers and freight on the main deck of the aircraft in addition to continuing to operate nonstop Electra service to Anchorage as well.  Reeve was continuing to operate 727 jet service nonstop to Anchorage during the late 1990s before ceasing all flight operations in 2000. From 2020 until the summer of 2021, Alaska Airlines flights to and from Adak would stop in Cold Bay to assist passengers with the shutdown of commuter flights from Anchorage to Cold Bay and Unalaska.

Statistics

Top destinations

Airline market share

Accidents and incidents

References

External links 

FAA Alaska airport diagram (GIF)
Topographic map from USGS The National Map

Military history
 The Thousand Mile War

Airports in Aleutians East Borough, Alaska